Litolinga is a genus of stiletto flies in the family Therevidae. There are at least two described species in Litolinga.

Species
These two species belong to the genus Litolinga:
 Litolinga acuta (Adams, 1903) i c g
 Litolinga tergisa (Say, 1823) i c g b
Data sources: i = ITIS, c = Catalogue of Life, g = GBIF, b = Bugguide.net

References

Further reading

 

Therevidae
Articles created by Qbugbot
Asiloidea genera